Kenny Barron at the Piano is a solo album by pianist Kenny Barron that was recorded in early 1981 and first released on the Xanadu label.

Reception 

In his review on AllMusic, Robert Taylor notes: "The set is a fine mix of standards and originals ... Along with the duets he recorded with Stan Getz, this stands as the high-water mark in his stellar recording career". In JazzTimes Philip Booth wrote: "At the Piano, Kenny Barron’s debut solo album, recorded in 1981 on a nine-foot Steinway in the same New York studio that was home to high-end classical players, offers an up-close snapshot of the virtuosity, broadly encompassing style and wide-ranging repertoire that would come to define his storied career".

Track listing 
All compositions by Kenny Barron except where noted.
 "Bud-Like" – 6:02
 "The Star-Crossed Lovers" (Billy Strayhorn, Duke Ellington) – 8:38
 "Misterioso" (Thelonious Monk) – 7:45
 "Calypso" – 4:02
 "Body and Soul" (Johnny Green, Edward Heyman, Robert Sour, Frank Eyton) – 6:58
 "Enchanted Flower" – 6:15
 "Rhythm-a-Ning" (Monk) – 5:43
 " Wazuri Blues" – 4:39 Bonus track on CD reissue

Personnel 
Kenny Barron – piano

References 

Kenny Barron albums
1982 albums
Xanadu Records albums
Albums produced by Don Schlitten
Solo piano jazz albums